GGE may refer to:
 Ecuato Guineana, the national airline of Equatorial Guinea;
 Gasoline gallon equivalent;
 Georgetown County Airport, in South Carolina, United States;
 Girls for Gender Equity, an American advocacy group;
 Guragone language, spoken in Australia;
 Grande galerie de l'Évolution, a building at the Jardin des plantes in Paris, France.